Oak Hills is a census-designated place (CDP) and neighborhood in Washington County, Oregon, United States. The CDP population was 9,050 at the 2000 census. It is on unincorporated land north of Beaverton, west of Cedar Mill, and south/southeast of Bethany. The CDP is roughly bounded by the Sunset Highway on the south, West Union Road on the north, Northwest 174th Avenue on the west, and Northwest 143rd Avenue on the east. The U.S. Postal Service has assigned Beaverton addresses to the area. Fire protection and EMS services are provided through Tualatin Valley Fire and Rescue.

The Oak Hills neighborhood is substantially smaller than the CDP, and is contained within the area bounded by Cornell Road on the south, West Union Road on the north, Bethany Boulevard on the west, and Northwest 143rd Avenue on the east. It was a planned community and was built in the 1960s. Oak Hills today includes around 650 residences, of which 627 are single-family homes. It is managed by the Oak Hills Homeowners Association (OHHA).

The neighborhood was listed on the National Register of Historic Places in 2013, as the Oak Hills Historic District.

Geography

Demographics

As of the census of 2000, there were 9,050 people, 3,397 households, and 2,374 families residing in the CDP. The population density was 5,864.8 people per square mile (2,269.0/km2). There were 3,478 housing units at an average density of 2,253.9 per square mile (872.0/km2). The racial makeup of the CDP was 78.46% White, 1.28% African American, 0.43% Native American, 13.76% Asian, 0.23% Pacific Islander, 3.01% from other races, and 2.83% from two or more races. Hispanic or Latino of any race were 5.82% of the population.

There were 3,397 households, out of which 39.8% had children under the age of 18 living with them, 59.8% were married couples living together, 6.7% had a female householder with no husband present, and 30.1% were non-families. 23.0% of all households were made up of individuals, and 2.9% had someone living alone who was 65 years of age or older. The average household size was 2.66 and the average family size was 3.19.

In the CDP, the population was spread out, with 29.0% under the age of 18, 9.0% from 18 to 24, 34.5% from 25 to 44, 21.6% from 45 to 64, and 6.0% who were 65 years of age or older. The median age was 32 years. For every 100 females, there were 103.0 males. For every 100 females age 18 and over, there were 102.1 males.

The median income for a household in the CDP was $61,217, and the median income for a family was $71,849. Males had a median income of $53,000 versus $29,864 for females. The per capita income for the CDP was $27,163. About 1.4% of families and 3.8% of the population were below the poverty line, including 3.3% of those under age 18 and 3.1% of those age 65 or over.

References

External links
 Oak Hills Homeowner's Association website
 Oak Hills Oracle newsletter

Census-designated places in Oregon
Historic districts on the National Register of Historic Places in Oregon
National Register of Historic Places in Washington County, Oregon
Neighborhoods in Oregon
Portland metropolitan area
Unincorporated communities in Washington County, Oregon
Planned communities in the United States
1965 establishments in Oregon
Census-designated places in Washington County, Oregon
Unincorporated communities in Oregon